In the restaurant industry, gueridon service or tableside service is the cooking or finishing of foods by a waiter (or maître d'hôtel) at the diner's table, typically from a special serving cart called a guéridon trolley. This type of service is implemented in fine dining restaurants where the average spending power is higher, and  a la carte menu is offered. Gueridon service offer a higher style of service to the guest.

It is similar to service à la russe, where every dish is portioned by a waiter tableside, but usually involves additional cooking steps.

Table side procedures include:
 Flambéing of dishes such as  crêpes Suzette, bananas Foster, cherries Jubilee, or Chicago-style saganaki;
 Mixing or tossing salads such as Caesar salad;
 Quick pan-frying and preparation of a pan sauce, as with steak Diane;
 Boning and plating fish;
 Preparing guacamole in a molcajete;
 Carving meat or poultry - specifically, carving a whole Peking Duck into bite-size skin- and meat pieces before serving each guest at the table. Conclusively, the juices may be extracted in a designated press and served on the side.
 Final preparation of a pasta dish, as with fettuccine Alfredo;
 Preparing a compound butter, such as beurre maître d'hôtel.

Gueridon trolley

A gueridon trolley typically has a gas burner with a chafing dish for cooking or heating food and a cupboard for the necessary ingredients, which may include condiments, liquor, cream, butter, oil, and other ingredients; and service equipment such as knives, spoons, platters, and so on.

Bibliography
 John Fuller, Guéridon and Lamp Cookery: A Complete Guide to Side-table and Flambé Service, Athens Book Company, 1964

Notes

Serving and dining
Table-cooked dishes